Friend leukemia integration 1 transcription factor (FLI1), also known as transcription factor ERGB, is a protein that in humans is encoded by the FLI1 gene, which is a proto-oncogene.

Function 

Fli-1 is a member of the ETS transcription factor family that was first identified in erythroleukemias induced by Friend Murine Leukemia Virus (F-MuLV). Fli-1 is activated through retroviral insertional mutagenesis in 90% of F-MuLV-induced erythroleukemias. The constitutive activation of fli-1 in erythroblasts leads to a dramatic shift in the Epo/Epo-R signal transduction pathway, blocking erythroid differentiation, activating the Ras pathway, and resulting in massive Epo-independent proliferation of erythroblasts. These results suggest that Fli-1 overexpression in erythroblasts alters their responsiveness to Epo and triggers abnormal proliferation by switching the signaling event(s) associated with terminal differentiation to proliferation.

Clinical significance 

In addition to Friend erythroleukemia, proviral integration at the fli-1 locus also occurs in leukemias induced by the 10A1, Graffi, and Cas-Br-E viruses. Fli-1 aberrant expression is also associated with chromosomal abnormalities in humans. In pediatric Ewing’s sarcoma a chromosomal translocation generates a fusion of the 5’ transactivation domain of EWSR1 (also known as EWS) with the 3’ Ets domain of Fli-1. The resulting fusion oncoprotein, EWS/Fli-1, acts as an aberrant transcriptional activator. with strong transforming capabilities. EWS/Fli-1 may steer clinically important genes via interaction with enhnacer-like GGAA-microsatellites. The importance of Fli-1 in the development of human leukemia, such as acute myelogenous leukemia (AML), has been demonstrated in studies of translocation involving the Tel transcription factor, which interacts with Fli-1 through protein-protein interactions. A recent study has demonstrated high levels of Fli-1 expression in several benign and malignant neoplasms using immunohistochemistry.

A possible association with Paris-Trousseau syndrome has been suggested.

References

Further reading

External links 
 

Transcription factors